The U.S. National Plant Germplasm System (NPGS) is a network of institutions and agencies (federal, state and private) led by the Agricultural Research Service (ARS) of the U.S. Department of Agriculture in the effort to conserve and facilitate the use of the genetic diversity of agriculturally important plants and their wild relatives.

Introduction 

Tremendous genetic variability exists in the local varieties (landraces) of crops and their closely related wild plants (crop wild relatives). The NPGS assists plant breeders and other research scientists by acquiring, conserving, evaluating, documenting, and distributing germplasm (seeds and other propagative material) of these plants, as well as of improved cultivars and breeding lines. This diverse germplasm provides the genetic raw material needed by plant breeders to develop new varieties of crops that have desirable qualities and can withstand constantly changing biological and environmental stresses. Conservation and use of this genetic diversity are critical to meeting the current and future challenges to global food security.

History 
Before the Americas were colonized by Europeans, native peoples domesticated indigenous plants including corn, squash and beans and spread them to new agricultural environments. European colonists adopted some crops from Native Americans and introduced others. As demand by farmers and hobbyists for expansion and diversification of agriculture in the U.S. eventually led the federal government to adopt a role in the introduction of and exploration for plant material, which had previously been spearheaded by individuals and agricultural societies. The history of federal plant introduction and exploration in the U.S. has been reviewed in numerous publications. In 1819, The Secretary of the Treasury issued a circular requesting that consuls stationed in other countries obtain seed of useful plants and send them to the U.S. Between 1836 and 1862 the U.S. Patent Office, first under the State Department and then under the Department of the Interior, administered a plant exploration and introduction program funded through yearly appropriations. The U.S. Department of Agriculture (USDA) was established in 1862 when President Abraham Lincoln signed the Department of Agriculture Organic Act into law. One of the Department's seven main responsibilities was the collection, testing and distribution of seeds and plants. The Department was headed by a Commissioner until 1889 when it was elevated to Cabinet rank and the first Secretary of Agriculture was appointed.

In 1898, a formal program of plant introduction was initiated with the establishment of the Section of Seed and Plant Introduction in USDA under the direction of noted plant explorer David Fairchild. According to the Annual Report of the Secretary of Agriculture for 1900, the Section's job was " to bring into this country for experimental purposes any foreign seeds and plants which might give promise of increasing the value and variety of our agricultural resources." Material was acquired from several sources, including participants in U.S. naval expeditions, diplomatic officials stationed in foreign countries, other governments and private individuals. The Section also began an intensive program of plant exploration by employing agricultural explorers, who spent most of their time traveling to other countries to collect plant samples.  Along with Fairchild, early notable USDA plant explorers included Frank N. Meyer, Niels E. Hansen, and Palemon Howard (P.H.) Dorsett. Many of the introductions brought to the U.S. by the USDA plant explorers led to establishing new or improved crops in the country. Special agent O.F. Cook in the Section initiated the system of assigning sequential Plant Introduction (PI) numbers to samples acquired by the Section and issuing the printed USDA Plant Inventories that documented them. These PI numbers continue to be assigned to material that enters into long-term curation by the NPGS.

The Section was also in charge of distributing the introduced plant material for evaluation and potential incorporation into U.S. agricultural production. Initially, the introduced material went to State Agricultural Experiment Stations or other reliable cooperators for testing. The need for facilities to test lesser known crops and later to quarantine plants to prevent introduction of plant pests led to the establishment of Federal Plant Introduction Gardens. The first such garden was established in Miami, Florida in 1898, followed by notable gardens at Chico, California in 1904, Savannah, Georgia in 1919, and Glen Dale, Maryland in 1919. Although these gardens propagated, tested and distributed promising plant materials, they were not intended for long-term maintenance. Early in its history, the Section also began fulfilling foreign and domestic requests for plant materials curated in the U.S. that were needed for research. This distribution mission remains a primary objective of the NPGS today, with about 250,000 samples being supplied annually to global plant breeders and other research scientists. Over the decades, germplasm exchange between countries has formed the basis for bilateral and multilateral collaborations involving training and research that benefit all parties.

The other elements of the NPGS were established gradually over many decades.The U.S. National Arboretum began operation in Washington, D.C. in 1927. The National Small Grains Collection was officially organized in 1948 in Beltsville, Maryland (later moved to Aberdeen, Idaho). Creation of other components of the system were enabled by the Research and Marketing Act of 1946. The Act provided the legal basis for federal-state cooperation in managing crop and livestock genetic resources and conducting research. As a result, a partnership between USDA and the State Agricultural Experiment Station (SAES) system was formed to establish Plant Introduction Stations at Ames, Iowa in 1948; Geneva, New York in 1948; Griffin, Georgia in 1949; and Pullman, Washington in 1952. The Inter-regional Potato Introduction Station (now the U.S. Potato Genebank) was established in Sturgeon Bay, Wisconsin in 1949. The National Seed Storage Laboratory, now the National Laboratory for Genetic Resources Preservation (NLGRP), in Fort Collins, Colorado was completed in 1958 to provide backup conservation and long-term storage of seeds and, more recently, clonal plant material. The NLGRP serves as a key component of the U.S. National Genetic Resources Program by housing the animal germplasm collection, and providing a backup site for plant and microbial collections. This ARS location also conducts research on the long-term crypreservation of agriculturally important genetic resources, and coordinates U.S. contributions to the Svalbard Global Seed Vault.

The present NPGS emerged in 1974 as a national program for germplasm after a restructuring of ARS. The cotton and soybean germplasm collections were consolidated into genebanks in College Station, Texas and Peoria, Illinois, respectively, in the 1970s, and nine additional genebank sites curating primarily clonally-propagated crops began operation in the mid-1980s. More recent additions to the NPGS are the National Arid Land Plant Genetic Resources Unit in Parlier, California (1996) and the Ornamental Plant Germplasm Center in Columbus, Ohio (2001).

The original Plant Introduction Gardens were deemed unnecessary and decommissioned after the genebank sites were established. Paper records and inventories from USDA genebanks were consolidated into a centralized information management system, the Germplasm Resources Information Network (GRIN), beginning in the 1980s, which was made publicly accessible through the internet beginning in 1994. The overall legal framework for the NPGS was established as part of the U.S. National Genetic Resources Program, authorized by the U.S. Congress through the 1990 Farm Bill.

The USDA-ARS National Germplasm Resources Laboratory in Beltsville, Maryland is a successor to the original USDA Section of Seed and Plant Introduction and manages the current Plant Exploration and Exchange Program, as well as the GRIN information management system.

Currently 
The NPGS currently is composed of genebanks and support units at 20 locations around the U.S. Each genebank is responsible for a collection of a unique set of crops. Several other collections that are not formally part of the NPGS also make material available for distribution through GRIN. The number of living, active accessions in the NPGS typically increases by several thousand annually and is currently nearing 600,000. The NPGS includes more than 15,000 species of plants, both sexually and asexually propagated, and represents one of the world's largest and most diverse living collections of plants curated by a single organization. New plant material continues to be added from the ongoing USDA Plant Exploration and Exchange Program, as well as from public and private sector donors in the U.S. and globally. Distributions are made to plant breeders and other researchers around the world. Crop Germplasm Committees composed of experts on genetic resources of specific crops provide input to the NPGS on acquisition and genebank curation issues. The NPGS is an exceptionally important U.S.living scientific collection, and the cornerstone of global efforts to ensure food security in the face of significant challenges posed by threats to crop production.

See also  

 Agricultural Research Service
 Germplasm Resources Information Network

External links 

 USDA-ARS National Agricultural Library exhibit on 1929-1932 Dorsett-Morse oriental expedition
 The Plant-Introduction Gardens of the Department of Agriculture, Article from the Yearbook of Agriculture, 1916
 The Business of Seed and Plant Introduction and Distribution, Article from the Yearbook of Agriculture, 1905   
 The U.S. National Plant Germplasm System An analysis of NPGS from National Academies Press, 1991
Seeds for Our Future: The U.S. National Germplasm System, U.S. Department of Agriculture, 1990

References 

Genetics organizations